The Candy Cane Mountains are shale mountains in the Khizi and Siyazan districts of Azerbaijan, part of the Greater Caucasus mountain range. The 'Candy Cane Mountains' were originally dubbed so by travel author Mark Elliott in his guidebook 'Azerbaijan with Excursions to Georgia'. The mountains' colors are produced by groundwater that alters the oxidation state of the iron compounds in the earth.  

The Candy Cane Mountains contain numerous belemnites and fossils from the Cretaceous period, many of which can be spotted on the surface.

See also 
Orography of Azerbaijan

References

Mountains of Azerbaijan
Khizi District
Siyazan District
Shale formations
Tourist attractions in Azerbaijan